Samuel Bishop (21 September 1731 – 17 November 1795) was a poet born in London, and educated at Merchant Taylors' School and Oxford University. He then took orders and served as Headmaster of Merchant Taylors' School (1783-1795). His poems on miscellaneous subjects fill two quarto volumes and the best of them are those to his wife and daughter. He also published essays.

Sources
Author and Bookinfo.com

1731 births
1795 deaths
People educated at Merchant Taylors' School, Northwood
English male poets